Muscleblind Like Splicing Regulator 1 (MBNL1) is an RNA splicing protein that in humans is encoded by the MBNL1 gene. It has a well characterized role in Myotonic dystrophy where impaired splicing disrupts muscle development and function. In addition to regulating mRNA maturation of hundreds of genes MBNL1 (along with its paralogs MBNL2 & MBNL3) autoregulate alternative splicing of the MBNL1 pre-mRNA transcript. The founding member of the human MBNL family of proteins was the Drosophila Muscleblind protein (PMID 9334280).

Human MBNL1 is an alternative splicing regulator that harbors dual function as both a repressor and activator for terminal muscle differentiation. The repressive function of Human MBNL1 by sequestering at normal splice sites has been shown to lead to RNA-splicing defects that lead to muscular diseases.

Human MBNL1 is a 370 amino acid protein composed of four Zinc Finger protein domains of the CCCH type linked in tandem. The MBNL1 protein specifically binds to double stranded CUG RNA expansions. The Zinc Finger domains play a role in both protein:protein contacts as well as RNA:protein contacts when bound to an oligonucleotide.

References

Further reading